Swamp Branch is an unincorporated community in Johnson County, Kentucky, United States. Its ZIP Code is 41240. Swamp Branch is located at an elevation of 728 feet (222 m).

Its post office opened on December 22, 1923, with Crate Rice as postmaster.

References

Unincorporated communities in Johnson County, Kentucky
Unincorporated communities in Kentucky